John Charles Cooksey (August 20, 1941 – June 4, 2022) was an American ophthalmologist and politician who served as a Republican member of the United States House of Representatives for Louisiana's 5th congressional district from 1997 to 2003.

Early life and education
Cooksey was born in Alexandria in Rapides Parish in Central Louisiana. He graduated from La Salle High School in Olla in LaSalle Parish, where his father operated a sawmill. He attended Louisiana State University in Baton Rouge and received his M.D. degree from the LSU Health Sciences Center New Orleans in 1966. In 1994, he received a Master of Business Administration from the University of Texas at Austin. From 1967 until 1969, he served in the United States Air Force, where he was stationed in Texas and Thailand. He served in the Air Force Reserve from 1969 until 1972.

Career
Cooksey was elected to Congress in 1996 and represented Louisiana's Fifth District for three terms, traditionally based in the northeastern quadrant of the state about Monroe, but since reconfigured to reach deep into South Louisiana as well. Cooksey first won the seat by defeating Democratic state legislator Francis C. Thompson of Delhi in Richland Parish. Cooksey had edged past former U.S. Representative Clyde C. Holloway of Forest Hill in Rapides Parish in the nonpartisan blanket primary. In that campaign, Cooksey pledged to serve no more than three terms in the House, a pledge that he kept.

Cooksey opposed abortion as a congressman but would not support efforts to address the issue through a constitutional amendment. He said that the nation already had too many "federal bureaucrats" making and interpreting policy and he distrusted the use of constitutional amendments to address most public policies.

In 2002, Cooksey was an unsuccessful candidate in the Republican primary for the United States Senate seat held until 2015 by Democrat Mary Landrieu. In that campaign, Cooksey made a derogatory remark about Arabs — comparing turbans and keffiyehs to diapers fastened by fan belts — which was attacked by his opponents as racist. He never overcame the blunder. In the November general election, the losing Republican candidate was Cooksey's intra-party rival, Suzanne Haik Terrell of New Orleans.

In addition to the reelection of Landrieu, the Democrats temporarily regained Cooksey's House seat in the same general election balloting. Democrat Rodney Alexander defeated Cooksey's choice, his former aide, Dewey Lee Fletcher, by fewer than one thousand votes. Alexander, however, defected to the GOP in 2004 and then defeated an intraparty rival, Jock Scott, of Alexandria for the congressional seat.

Personal life

After his Senate campaign, Cooksey retired from politics and resumed his medical practice. He and his wife, the former Ann Grabill (born 1943), had three children. He was Methodist and a member of Lambda Chi Alpha fraternity.

Cooksey died in Columbia, Louisiana on June 4, 2022, at the age of 80.

References

External links
 
 Vote 2002 profile, PBS
 Congress freshmen 1997 profile, CNN
 

1941 births
2022 deaths
20th-century American physicians
20th-century American politicians
21st-century American physicians
21st-century American politicians
American ophthalmologists
Candidates in the 2002 United States elections
Louisiana State University alumni
McCombs School of Business alumni
Methodists from Louisiana
Military personnel from Louisiana
Physicians from Louisiana
Politicians from Alexandria, Louisiana
Politicians from Monroe, Louisiana
Republican Party members of the United States House of Representatives from Louisiana
United States Air Force airmen
United States Air Force reservists